Meyrowitz:
 Carol Meyrowitz, CEO
 Joshua Meyrowitz, communications professor 
 Norman Meyrowitz
 Robert Meyrowitz, radio producer
 Robert Meyrowitz (1916-2013), an American analytical chemist

See also 
 Meyerowitz (disambiguation)

Jewish surnames
Slavic-language surnames

he:מאירוביץ